Gnaphosa lapponum is a ground spider genus found from Europe to Central Asia. It is also found in Finland.

See also 
 List of Gnaphosidae species

References

External links 

Gnaphosidae
Spiders of Asia
Spiders of Europe
Spiders described in 1866